Marker is a  2005 thriller novel by Robin Cook.

References

2005 American novels
Novels by Robin Cook